Drivers Wanted may refer to:
Drivers Wanted (2005 film), American 2005 comedy film
Drivers Wanted (2012 film), American 2012 documentary film